Andrew Herd Actor, Star Wars, Harry Potter, etc.

Grandson of Fred Herd Scottish Golfer 1898 US Open Champion & Nephew of Sandy Herd Scottish golfer,

Sandy Herd (1868–1944), Scottish golfer, Open Championship winner in 1902
Sandy Herd (footballer) (born 1902), Scottish football player (Dundee FC, Dunfermline Athletic, Heart of Midlothian FC, East Fife, Scotland)